Pierce "Caddy" Works (January 2, 1896 – July 19, 1982) was an American basketball and baseball coach.  He was the head basketball coach at University of California, Los Angeles (UCLA)—known as the Southern Branch of the University of California until 1927—for 18 seasons, from 1921 to 1939, compiling a record of 173–159.  Works was also the head baseball coach at Southern Branch from 1925 to 1926, tallying a mark of 23–14.

Works was a lawyer by profession and coached the team only during the evenings.  According to UCLA player and future Olympian Frank Lubin, Works was "more of an honorary coach" with little basketball knowledge.

Head coaching record

Basketball

References

External links
 

1896 births
1982 deaths
American men's basketball coaches
American men's basketball players
Baseball first basemen
California Golden Bears men's basketball players
UCLA Bruins baseball coaches
UCLA Bruins men's basketball coaches
Wichita Falls Spudders players